Strange Fruit is an instrumental album by Family Vibes. The album was released on United Artists Records in January 1972. Led by Ike Turner, Family Vibes was the backing band for Ike & Tina Turner. They are best known as the Kings of Rhythm, but the name of the band changed to Family Vibes for a few years in the 1970s.

Recording and release 
Strange Fruit was recorded at Ike Turner's Bolic Sound Studios in Inglewood, California in October 1971. Turner arranged and produced the album. His sister-in-law Alline Bullock wrote two songs on the album, "Happy But Lonely" and "Bootie Lip." The latter was released as a B-side single to "Soppin' Molasses" in 1972.

Track listing

Personnel 

 Arranger – Ike Turner
 Bass – Warren Dawson
 Baritone Saxophone – J. D. Reed
 Drums – Soko Richardson
 Engineer – Steve Waldman
 Guitar – Jackie Clark
 Organ – Ike Turner
 Producer – Ike Turner
 Tenor Saxophone – Jimmy Smith
 Tenor Saxophone – Larry Reed
 Trombone – Edward Burks
 Trumpet – Claude Williams, Mack Johnson

References 

1972 albums
Ike Turner albums
Albums produced by Ike Turner
United Artists Records albums
Instrumental albums
Albums recorded at Bolic Sound